"Welcome to Paradise"  is a song by American rock band Green Day. It first appeared as the third track on the band's second studio album, Kerplunk (1991). It was re-recorded and rereleased as the fifth track on their third studio album, Dookie (1994), and released as the album's second single on March 4, 1994. The song peaked at number 56 on the US Billboard Hot 100 Airplay chart. The Dookie version is more popular and was later included on the band's 2001 compilation album International Superhits!. "Welcome to Paradise" is playable in the video game Green Day: Rock Band.

Song meaning and composition
The lyrics of the song were written by Billie Joe Armstrong, and the music by Armstrong with Mike Dirnt and Tré Cool. It is based on the band's experience moving out of their parents' houses and into an abandoned house in Oakland, California where the band members, along with a number of others, lived without paying rent. The house was quite broken-down but to them it became home, and this feeling is described in the song.

Billie Joe Armstrong said this of the song:

The song is played with the guitar tuned a half-step down, as are many of their Dookie songs.

The song is sung as Billie is talking or sending a message to his mother, after moving out of her house. The first verse is Armstrong talking to his mother after three weeks of leaving her place, telling her that he's scared about being on his own. The second part describes Armstrong writing to her after six months of living at his own place, now being happy to live on his own.

Music video
A video was released for the song. It features the band playing live, while the studio version from the Dookie album is playing during the band's performance. It is one of two videos not to be included on the band's first DVD, International Supervideos! (The other being "Macy's Day Parade").

Track listing
 "Welcome to Paradise" – 3:45
 "Chump" (live) – 2:44
 "Emenius Sleepus" – 1:44
 Track 2 was recorded on March 11, 1994, at Jannus Landing, St. Petersburg, Florida.

Charts

Certifications

Release history

In popular culture
"Welcome to Paradise" was featured in the movie Surf's Up, though was not released on the film's soundtrack. The song was also featured in the trailer for Couples Retreat.

References

External links
 

1991 songs
1994 singles
Green Day songs
Reprise Records singles
Songs about California
Song recordings produced by Rob Cavallo
Songs written by Billie Joe Armstrong
Songs written by Mike Dirnt
Songs written by Tré Cool
Warner Music Group singles